Myrin is a surname. Notable people with the surname include: 

Arden Myrin (born 1973), American actress, author, and comedian
Jonas Myrin (born 1982), Swedish singer, songwriter and producer